Nizam ul-Mulk (1 January 1861 – 1 January 1895) was the Mehtar of the princely state of Chitral and ruled it from 1892 until his assassination in 1895.

References

Mehtars of Chitral
1861 births
1895 deaths
Princely rulers of Pakistan
Nawabs of Pakistan